Delissea rhytidosperma, is known by the common names Kauai delissea, Kauai leechleaf delissea, and leechleaf delissea. It is a rare species of flowering plant in the bellflower family, that is endemic to Hawaii where it is known only from the island of Kauai. It is critically endangered or extinct in the wild.

Some populations that were formerly included in the species D. rhytidosperma are now called Delissea kauaiensis. It is a federally listed endangered species.

Description

The leaves have lance-shaped or nearly oval blades up to 19 centimeters long. The tubular flowers have greenish or purplish petals and distinctive hairs next to the anthers.

The plant's natural habitat is rocky cliffsides in moist forests dominated by Acacia koa. This habitat has been destroyed and degraded by the action of feral pigs, goats, and mule deer, and by exotic plant species. Germination and establishment are further limited by non-native rodents, snails, and grasses.

References

External links
USDA Plants Profile
The Nature Conservancy

Lobelioideae
Endemic flora of Hawaii
Biota of Kauai